Omnisportvereniging Hellas Den Haag is a Dutch handball club from The Hague (Den Haag).

Its women's team is one of the leading Dutch teams, with nine championships between 1955 and 2005. Its most successful period lasted from 1976 to 1982, with five championships and three appearances in the European Cup's quarter-finals (1977, 1978, 1982). Hellas returned to European competitions following the turn of the century, with appearances in the Champions League's qualifying stages, the Cup Winners' Cup and the EHF Cup.

Titles
 Eredivisie
 1955, 1957, 1976, 1977, 1978, 1980, 1981, 2002, 2005

References

Sports clubs in The Hague
Dutch handball clubs